Bartosz Sikora (born 16 December 1975) is a retired Polish backstroke and freestyle swimmer. He competed in two events at the 1996 Summer Olympics.

References

External links
 

1975 births
Living people
Polish male freestyle swimmers
Polish male backstroke swimmers
Olympic swimmers of Poland
Swimmers at the 1996 Summer Olympics
Sportspeople from Gdynia
20th-century Polish people